Wan Muhamad Noor Matha, also called Wan Nor, (born 11 May 1944 in Yala, Thailand) is a Thai politician. He is a founder of the Wahdah Group, a small lobby of Muslim politicians from the Southern provinces. He is a former university lecturer at Songkhla Rajabhat University and Thaksin University.

Education
Wan Muhamad Noor Matha graduated primary school from Ban Sateng School, Yala Province, lower secondary school level at Kanaratbamrung School in Yala Province and upper secondary at Islamic College of Thailand in Bangkok. After that he received a Bachelor's degree of Bachelor of Education at Chulalongkorn University with the Ministry of Interior scholarship and have a Master's degree in the Faculty of Education (Educational Administration), Chulalongkorn University as well.

Careers
He began to serve as a teacher and was appointed head teacher at Attarkiah Academy in Narathiwat Province From only 20 years old, in 1969 has moved to become a teacher at Songkhla Teachers College (Currently, Songkhla Rajabhat University) in 1975 he is a professor of the Faculty of Education, Srinakharinwirot University, Songkhla (now Thaksin University) and is a special professor Faculty of Education at Prince of Songkla University together as well. Then in the year 1978 he was appointed Vice President of Songkhla Teacher College.

Political career
He was elected to the Thai House of Representatives in 1979, representing Yala Province and the Social Action Party until 1984. He moved to the Democratic Party in 1986, to the Solidarity Party in 1988, and to the New Aspiration Party in 1992. Each time he took a group of representatives from the Muslim-majority provinces of Narathiwat, Pattani and Yala—called "Wahdah Group"—with him. After 1980 he worked in the Ministry of Finance and Industry. From 1994 to 1995, he was appointed Deputy Minister of the Interior and was President (Speaker) of Parliament from November 1996 to June 2000.

When New Aspiration Party dissolved and merged with the Thai Rak Thai party in 2001. He became Minister of Transport and Communications, in October 2002 Minister of the Interior.

As one of 111 executive members of the TRT, he was banned from political activities for five years after the 2006 coup d'état.

After the 2006 Thai coup d'état and Thaksin's fall, Wan Noor was appointed Director of the National Drug Control Centre and promised vigorous action. He initially joined the TRT's successor party People's Power Party in 2008, but at the time a five-year ban on political activity was enforced. The Wahdah Group evolved into the Matubhum Party.

Honour 
  Order of the White Elephant
  Order of the Crown of Thailand

References

Living people
1944 births
Wan Muhamad Noor Matha
Wan Muhamad Noor Matha
Wan Muhamad Noor Matha
Wan Muhamad Noor Matha
Wan Muhamad Noor Matha
Wan Muhamad Noor Matha
Wan Muhamad Noor Matha
Wan Muhamad Noor Matha
Wan Muhamad Noor Matha
Wan Muhamad Noor Matha
Wan Muhamad Noor Matha